Sustainable planting is an approach to planting design and landscaping-gardening.

Practical examples 
 When creating new roads or widening current roads, the Nevada Department of Transportation will reserve topsoil and native plants for donation.
 The Grain for Green Program in China pays farmers to convert their retired farmland back into forests or other natural landscapes.

See also
Sustainable landscaping
Sustainable gardening
Sustainable landscape architecture

References

Sustainable gardening
Landscape architecture
Sustainable agriculture
Garden plants